Hip scoring is a procedure used to determine the degree of hip dysplasia in dogs and other animals and reporting the findings in a standard way. The hip score is the sum of the points awarded for each of nine radiographic features of both hip joints.

The British Veterinary Association uses the following criteria to determine hip score:
 Norberg Angle
 Subluxation
 Cranial Acetabular Edge
 Dorsal Acetabular Edge
 Cranial Effective Acetabular Rim
 Acetabular Fossa
 Caudal Acetabular Edge
 Femoral Head/Neck Exostosis
 Femoral Head Recontouring

The lower the score, the less the degree of dysplasia present. The minimum (best) score for each hip is zero, and the maximum (worst) is 53, giving a range for the total of 0 to 106. Each hip is scored separately under the BVA, so within the UK scores are usually displayed as two numbers separated by a forward slash (e.g. 2/6). The highest score of one of both hips (BVA) is taken to provide a score for international comparison.

The following table compares the scores recognised by Orthopaedic Foundation for Animals (OFA), Fédération Cynologique Internationale (FCI), the British Veterinary Association (BVA) and Verein für Deutsche Schäferhunde (SV).

British Veterinarian Association

The average hip scores in the year 2005 for popular breeds from Australia are tabulated below:
(Scores of both hips together)

References

Dog anatomy
Dog health